Hořičky is a municipality and village in Náchod District in the Hradec Králové Region of the Czech Republic. It has about 600 inhabitants.

Administrative parts
Villages of Chlístov, Křižanov, Mečov and Nový Dvůr are administrative parts of Hořičky.

References

Villages in Náchod District